Gródek or Grodek may refer to:

Places

Poland
 Gródek, Kuyavian-Pomeranian Voivodeship (north-central Poland)
 Gródek, Lesser Poland Voivodeship (south Poland)
 Gródek, Lower Silesian Voivodeship (south-west Poland)
 Gródek, Hrubieszów County in Lublin Voivodeship (east Poland)
 Gródek, Puławy County in Lublin Voivodeship (east Poland)
 Gródek, Tomaszów Lubelski County in Lublin Voivodeship (east Poland)
 Gródek, Sokołów County in Masovian Voivodeship (east-central Poland)
 Gródek, Zwoleń County in Masovian Voivodeship (east-central Poland)
 Gródek, Białystok County in Podlaskie Voivodeship (north-east Poland)
 Gródek, Wysokie Mazowieckie County in Podlaskie Voivodeship (north-east Poland)
 Gródek, Silesian Voivodeship (south Poland)
 Gródek, Świętokrzyskie Voivodeship (south-central Poland)

Czech Republic
 Gródek, the Polish name for Hrádek in the Czech Republic

Ukraine
 Gródek Jagielloński, the former Polish town, now called Horodok, Lviv Oblast in Ukraine
 Gródek, the Polish name for Horodok, Khmelnytskyi Oblast in Ukraine

Literature
 Grodek, a poem by the Austrian Expressionist poet Georg Trakl

See also
 Gródek nad Dunajcem
 Gródek Nowy
 Gródek Rządowy
 Gródek Szlachecki